The Patient Freedom Act of 2017 was a United States healthcare plan proposed by senators Susan Collins (Maine) and Bill Cassidy (La.) on January 23, 2017, to replace the Affordable Care Act. It would have offered states the option to retain the Affordable Care Act, if they chose, or receive a block grant to be used on an alternative plan they prefer.

See also 
 2017 Patient Protection and Affordable Care Act replacement proposals
 Efforts to repeal the Patient Protection and Affordable Care Act

References 

United States proposed federal health legislation